In theatre (especially in the illusionistic Western tradition), breaking character occurs when an actor ceases to maintain the illusion that they are the character they are supposedly portraying. This is considered unprofessional while performing in front of an audience or camera (except when the act is a deliberate breaking of the fourth wall). One of the most common ways of breaking character is corpsing, in which an actor loses their composure and laughs or giggles in a comedy scene or scene requiring ludicrous actions. If the breaking of character is particularly serious, it would normally result in an abandonment of a take in recorded or filmed drama.

Famous breaks in film

The advent of DVD players, with the use of their precise pause and slow-motion functions, has made it far easier to spot breaks in character in motion pictures, and many internet sites collect such examples.

Examples of breaking character in movies include:
Catherine Schell, who found it difficult to act with Peter Sellers in The Return of the Pink Panther and maintain her composure. Several scenes showing her laughing at his antics remain in the film.
Peter Bull briefly breaks character in the film Dr. Strangelove, as he begins to laugh at the over-the-top behavior of Peter Sellers' character (Dr. Strangelove), but regains his composure.
Virginia North had so much trouble trying not to laugh in a dance scene with Vincent Price in The Abominable Dr. Phibes that she had to be photographed behind him to conceal her face, although her smile is briefly visible.
In The Wizard of Oz, during an encounter with the Cowardly Lion (played by Bert Lahr), Judy Garland, as Dorothy, hides her face behind the dog Toto in order to conceal the fact that she is laughing rather than frightened as she observes Lahr's performance.
In the 1959 version of The Hound of the Baskervilles, Christopher Lee can be seen smirking at Miles Malleson and his comic acting when his back is turned.
Jack Nicholson laughs during the campfire scenes in the 1969 film Easy Rider. It is well known that the entire cast was smoking actual marijuana during the takes, and several moments between Nicholson, Dennis Hopper and Peter Fonda are punctuated by natural chuckles.
In the 1974 film Blazing Saddles, Gene Wilder's character Jim delivers a monologue to Sheriff Bart (Cleavon Little) explaining the nature of the simple townsfolk, concluding with the line, "You know. Morons." Little, who was not told about the final line, visibly struggles to keep a straight face throughout the speech; when Wilder reaches his conclusion, Little breaks out laughing. This take was used in the film.
In the 1987 film Dirty Dancing, actress Jennifer Grey repeatedly laughed during a dance move in which her costar Patrick Swayze inadvertently tickled her while stroking her arm. Her laughter, as well as Swayze's frustrated reaction, were used as part of a montage in the film, culminating in the pair successfully completing the move without Grey laughing.
In the film A Knight's Tale, Mark Addy breaks character in the first sword fighting scene after Paul Bettany's character gives a rousing speech and no one responds. The crowd were actually Czech men and women who did not understand the speech or that they were supposed to cheer; only after Addy yelled did they remember to cheer.
An early scene in The Usual Suspects has the main characters forming a police lineup, where they are all asked to say the words, "Hand me the keys, you fuckin' cocksucker!" in order to help a witness identify a suspect. The scene was originally supposed to be played straight, but the actors could not do it without cracking up due to Benicio del Toro constantly farting on set, so it was decided that the characters would laugh over the line.
During a scene in the 1999 comedy Life, the characters played by Martin Lawrence and Eddie Murphy are standing on boxes of beer. Claude mentions to Ray that one of his toes slipped into one of the bottles, which actually happened during the take, and Murphy's laughter during the incident was genuine. But Lawrence remained in character and turned to Murphy and asked him what he was laughing at. Murphy can clearly be seen trying to compose himself.
In Scary Movie 2, when Dwight and Hanson are insulting each other, actor Marlon Wayans lets out an over the top laugh which the rest of the people at the dinner are obviously laughing at.

On television

Examples of actors breaking character on television include:

 Lucille Ball, in a rare example of breaking character for her, was forced to break character during taping of "Lucy and Viv Put in a Shower", a season 1 episode of The Lucy Show. In the climactic scene, the titular shower filled with water due to a drain malfunction, and Ball nearly drowned attempting to unplug it. Co-star Vivian Vance hastily reworked the script to allow Ball to recover her composure. Ball's near-drowning was included in the finished episode, which was one of several from the series to lapse into the public domain.
 Andy Kaufman had an infamous appearance on Fridays where he broke character in the middle of a sketch, prompting fellow cast member Michael Richards to grab the cue cards and throw them on a table in front of Andy. A fight also erupted on camera before the show cut to commercial. It was later revealed that this was a gag prearranged by Kaufman and the show's producers in collusion with Richards, although not everyone on set was aware it was a joke.
 Harvey Korman was infamous for breaking character on The Carol Burnett Show when he would start laughing during sketches, usually due to the antics of Tim Conway, who would deliberately try to crack Korman up. Although Korman was the most frequent cast member to break character and Conway was the most frequent to go off script, all the cast members are guilty of doing both. This is widely acknowledged as an extremely popular aspect of the show with audiences both live in the studio and at home.
 The sitcom Yes, Minister had an example of breaking character, as it was recorded live before a studio audience. In the Series 3, Episode 3 episode "Skeletons in the Cupboard", actor Derek Fowlds (playing Bernard Woolley) responds to the line "Why, did he faint?" by smiling and laughing, apparently unable to deliver his line. This prompts Paul Eddington to break character as well, responding, "This is serious, Bernard." Both men struggle to maintain their composure for a few moments, with Eddington even covering his face with his pocket handkerchief.
 A sketch on sketch show A Bit of Fry & Laurie had an instance of breaking character. The sketch involved Stephen Fry playing a journalist who interviews a racecar driver played by Hugh Laurie and becomes increasingly infuriated by the whiny, self-pitying attitude he displays even though he has just won a race. The sketch ended, as was not unusual on A Bit of Fry & Laurie, with Fry's character punching Laurie's in the face. In this instance his fist actually connected, and although Laurie is knocked out of frame, Fry can be seen reacting with shock and then covering his face to hide a grin.
 Many instances of breaking character have occurred on Saturday Night Live, and showrunner Lorne Michaels is known to enjoy character breaks:
Christina Applegate and David Spade could not stop laughing at Chris Farley's motivational speaker character, Matt Foley.  
The band members in the "More Cowbell" sketch broke character reacting to Will Ferrell's antics. Jimmy Fallon often broke character, which became one of his trademarks.
 Michael Jordan broke character by laughing during a Stuart Smalley (Al Franken) sketch as he attempted to say the line, "I don't have to be a great basketball player." 
Peyton Manning hosted an episode in which there was a sketch involving Will Forte playing a basketball coach who began to dance flamboyantly to "Casino Royale" by Herb Alpert & The Tijuana Brass in order to pump up the team. The team (who were played by Manning, Kenan Thompson, Bill Hader, Andy Samberg, Jason Sudeikis and Fred Armisen) all tried to hold in their laughter, but they all ended up cracking.
 Another incident was on the first episode, involving a sketch of the cast members in bee costumes. In the following episode, the cast members come out with their costumes on, only to have Paul Simon tell them that the sketch was cut. 
 Bill Hader often broke character while performing as his popular character, Stefon. This is because SNL writer John Mulaney kept changing the script and cue cards before airing so that Hader would be unaware of the jokes; Hader developed a tic for the character of holding his hands over his mouth to hide his laughter.
 In the Doctor Who episode "The Feast of Steven", actor William Hartnell breaks character to wish the audience a merry Christmas, with actors Peter Purves and Jean Marsh also breaking character, erupting in laughter. The Christmas address was scripted, but the laughter was not. In episode 5 of the Doctor Who story Frontier in Space, there is a scene in which the Master (Roger Delgado) leads captive Jo Grant (Katy Manning) through a rocky terrain. Despite his typically soulless nature, the Master audibly tells Jo to "be careful down here" – an out-of-character statement from Delgado to aid Manning, who is very nearsighted.
 The members of Monty Python's Flying Circus could occasionally be seen trying not to laugh during sketches, most noticeably during the "Burma" or "Exploding Penguin" sketch, where Graham Chapman suppresses laughter while listening to the "death of Mary, Queen of Scots" on the radio, and later almost causes John Cleese to crack up when he shouts the line, "Intercourse the penguin!". Self-referential character breaks were also often written into the sketches themselves, with characters suddenly deciding that a sketch had become "too silly" to continue.
 On The Daily Show, Jon Stewart or one of the correspondents occasionally broke character during a segment. One example was a piece on an allegation of a homosexual relationship involving the then Prince Charles and the British tabloids' shameless use of innuendo and euphemisms to spread the rumor while avoiding libelous statements. The segment had Stephen Colbert "reporting" from Britain and explaining, in terms laden with homoerotic imagery, that it would be journalistically irresponsible to go into detail about the story. He then peeled a banana and took a huge bite of it in imitation of fellatio, causing himself to smile and Stewart to begin giggling off screen. By the end of the segment, Colbert was laughing so hard he could barely speak.
 On Colbert's own show The Colbert Report, Colbert has made numerous character breaks when performing alone, giggling over things such as his own suggestion of "Filliam H. Muffman" as a tabloid nickname for the relationship of William H. Macy and Felicity Huffman; a news story about a giant inflatable dog turd that escaped its moorings and wrought destruction in England; and various prop malfunctions, including a condom he blew up and then accidentally popped and a bottle of Manischewitz spilled behind his "news" desk.
 On the soap opera General Hospital, actor Steve Burton broke character once during the aftermath of Spinelli and Maxie's wedding. When the groom takes off his wife's garter, he makes a high-pitched, cheering sound as he waves the garter in the air. Burton can be seen turning his head away to avoid being seen laughing, as his character is supposed to be stoic. Actor Bradford Anderson broke character in 2010, when his character was throwing a welcome home party for Jason, and had put up letters that spelled Welcome Home. The "M" soon fell off the wall, and when Burton, as his character, pointed this out, Anderson can be seen slipping out of character for a moment, not knowing how to respond to Welcome Hoe.
 On a July 16, 2015 episode of Eat Bulaga!, through their portion Kalyeserye, Yaya Dub (portrayed by Maine Mendoza) broke character when she smiled at Alden Richards watching her for her lip-syncing talent or Dubsmash, (Note that Richards was in the studio while Mendoza is on the Barangay because the series is on split-screen.) However, it had caught the attention of all viewers and it was also the time showbiz industry gave birth to its new loveteam, AlDub, composed of Richards and Mendoza.

Virtual and gaming environments

Breaking character or corpsing is also being used more frequently to describe a participant-player who, having assumed the role of a virtual character or avatar and is acting within a virtual or gaming environment, then breaks out of that character. For example, this could be a player-character behaving inappropriately within the social-cultural environment depicted by the virtual or gaming environment or the participant-player ceasing to interact-play (momentarily or entirely) leaving the character suspended and/or lifeless.

Professional wrestling

Breaking character is not solely limited to performances in traditional theater, television, and film; the phenomenon is not unheard of in professional wrestling, which is normally highly scripted. WWE commentator Jim Ross once famously broke character during a match in which WWE wrestler (and friend of Ross) Mick Foley took a 16-foot "bump" (fall) through the roof of a steel cage structure known as Hell in a Cell. Ross exclaimed, "Will somebody stop the damn match?!" While phrases such as that are often used by professional wrestling commentators to make matches seem more legitimate, Ross later stated that he made the comment out of character, being seriously worried for his friend (who had, indeed, suffered a severe concussion as a result of the fall). Later on in the match, Ross broke character by calling Mick "the toughest son of a bitch he had ever seen, period", before covering for himself by adding, "...in this sort of environment" [i.e. the cell itself].

Much of the WWF roster broke character in 1999 when Owen Hart fell to his death from the rafters of Kemper Arena in Kansas City; much of the onscreen drama of the WWE was similarly shunted aside in 2005 for some weeks after the death of Eddie Guerrero. In 2007, after the death of the Benoit family, Vince McMahon was forced to abandon the storyline of his "death", appearing out of character to speak about the incident and its repercussions. In 2008 the night Ric Flair retired on WWE Raw, numerous wrestlers broke kayfabe, including Edge, Randy Orton, Paul "Big Show" Wight, as well as The Undertaker broke character when they sobbed and hugged Flair after the show. In April 2011 when Edge came to the ring and announced his retirement, he had broken his character. There were no pyros at his entrance music and when he went backstage, all WWE Superstars hugged him and acknowledged him. Dolph Ziggler was also seen hugging Edge, where Dolph came out of character (or broke his character) and was a "face" at that moment in time, otherwise he is a heel when he is in character.

Another famous incident of "breaking character" belongs to Kevin Nash, Shawn Michaels, Triple H, and Scott Hall in 1996 at Madison Square Garden during "The MSG Incident". Kevin Nash and Scott Hall were both jumping ship from WWE (or World Wrestling Federation at the time) to WCW (World Championship Wrestling) and this night was the last contractual night that Hall and Nash had with WWE. The four men were part of a group known in the back stage area as "The Kliq" along with Sean Waltman. At a major WWE event, the four men were involved in two separate matches. Scott Hall faced off with Triple H earlier in the evening; with Shawn Michaels taking on Kevin Nash later. After the latter match, the four men embraced in a hug after Scott Hall entered the ring to hug with Shawn Michaels (which was not seen as a problem as both men were "faces" at the time) but then afterwards, Triple H had entered the ring and all four men then embraced in a group hug in one of the corners and then all had stood in the ring facing the crowd with raised arms.

Fictional depictions of breaking character 
In Ruggero Leoncavallo's opera Pagliacci, commedia dell'arte actor Canio kills his real-life wife and her lover onstage.

See also 
 Out of character communication in the sociological theory of dramaturgy

References

Notes  

Metafictional techniques